The 2008 Budapest Grand Prix was a women's tennis tournament played on outdoor clay courts. It was the 14th edition of the Budapest Grand Prix, and was part of the Tier III Series of the 2008 WTA Tour. It took place in Budapest, Hungary, from 7 July until 13 July 2008. Second-seeded Alizé Cornet won the singles title and earned $28,000 first-prize money.

Finals

Singles

 Alizé Cornet defeated  Andreja Klepač, 7–6(7–5), 6–3
It was Alizé Cornet's 1st career title.

Doubles

 Alizé Cornet /  Janette Husárová defeated  Vanessa Henke /  Ioana Raluca Olaru, 6–7(5–7), 6–1, [10–6]

External links
 ITF tournament edition details
 Tournament draws

Budapest Grand Prix
Budapest Grand Prix
Buda
Buda